Lawrence John Woolley (born 23 August 1950 in Melton Mowbray), known as John Woolley, is a sport shooter from New Zealand who has represented New Zealand at three Olympic Games and four Commonwealth Games.

At the 1976 Summer Olympics at Montreal he came 26th in the skeet.

At the 1978 Commonwealth Games at Edmonton he came first in the skeet for a gold medal.

At the 1982 Commonwealth Games at Brisbane he came first in the skeet for a gold medal, and 4th in the skeet pair.

At the 1984 Summer Olympics at Los Angeles he came 26th in the skeet.

At the 1986 Commonwealth Games at Edinburgh he came 4th in the skeet, and 3rd in the skeet pair for a bronze medal.

At the 1988 Summer Olympics at Seoul he came 33rd in the Olympic Skeet.

At the 1990 Commonwealth Games at Auckland he came 5th in the skeet, and 3rd in the skeet pair for a bronze medal.

References 
 Black Gold by Ron Palenski (2008, 2004 New Zealand Sports Hall of Fame, Dunedin) p. 97

External links 
 

Living people
1950 births
New Zealand male sport shooters
Shooters at the 1978 Commonwealth Games
Shooters at the 1982 Commonwealth Games
Shooters at the 1986 Commonwealth Games
Shooters at the 1990 Commonwealth Games
Olympic shooters of New Zealand
Shooters at the 1976 Summer Olympics
Shooters at the 1984 Summer Olympics
Shooters at the 1988 Summer Olympics
Commonwealth Games gold medallists for New Zealand
Commonwealth Games bronze medallists for New Zealand
Commonwealth Games medallists in shooting
Medallists at the 1978 Commonwealth Games
Medallists at the 1982 Commonwealth Games
Medallists at the 1986 Commonwealth Games
Medallists at the 1990 Commonwealth Games